The United Party, known in Greek simply as Eniaion ("United"), was a short-lived moderate right-wing political party in Cyprus.

History
The party was established by Glafcos Clerides in February 1969 as a split from the Patriotic Front.

In the 1970 parliamentary elections the party emerged as the largest in the House of Representatives with 15 seats, despite finishing second in the vote tally.

The party did not contest any further elections, with Clerides going onto establish the pro-Western Democratic Rally prior to the 1976 elections and Spyros Kyprianou going onto establish the more pro-Makarios, moderate nationalist Democratic Party.

Elected MPs

References

Political parties established in 1969
Defunct political parties in Cyprus